Recreation Day is a public holiday in northern Tasmania. It is held on the first Monday in November, and was instituted to offset Regatta Day in southern Tasmania. It is observed in all parts of Tasmania north of (but not including) Oatlands and Swansea. This area includes Strathgordon, Tarraleah and the West Coast.

References

Northern Tasmania
November observances
Public holidays in Australia
Monday observances 
Holidays and observances by scheduling (nth weekday of the month)
Spring (season) events in Australia
North West Tasmania
North East Tasmania
Western Tasmania